Nathaniel Barnett Jr. (born January 29, 1953) is an American retired basketball player. He played collegiately for the University of Akron and was selected by the Houston Rockets in the 7th round (119th pick overall) of the 1975 NBA draft. Later, he played for the Indiana Pacers (1975–76) in the ABA.

Barnett played for the Anchorage Northern Knights of the Continental Basketball Association during the 1979–80 season.

References

External links

1953 births
Living people
Akron Zips men's basketball players
American men's basketball players
American people of Nigerian descent
Anchorage Northern Knights players
Houston Rockets draft picks
Indiana Pacers players
Point guards
Sportspeople from Ibadan